The 2017 President's Cup was a professional tennis tournament played on outdoor hard courts. It was the twelfth (men) and ninth (women) editions of the tournament and was part of the 2017 ATP Challenger Tour and the 2017 ITF Women's Circuit. It took place in Astana, Kazakhstan, on 17–23 July 2017.

Men's singles main draw entrants

Seeds 

 1 Rankings as of 3 July 2017.

Other entrants 
The following players received a wildcard into the singles main draw:
  Andrey Golubev
  Roman Khassanov
  Grigoriy Lomakin
  Denis Yevseyev

The following player received entry into the singles main draw using a protected ranking:
  Farrukh Dustov

The following players received entry from the qualifying draw:
  Hugo Grenier
  Evgeny Karlovskiy
  Saketh Myneni
  Evgeny Tyurnev

Women's singles main draw entrants

Seeds 

 1 Rankings as of 3 July 2017.

Other entrants 
The following players received a wildcard into the singles main draw:
  Anna Danilina
  Dariya Detkovskaya
  Yekaterina Dmitrichenko
  Zhibek Kulambayeva

The following player received entry by a protected ranking:
  Vitalia Diatchenko

The following players received entry from the qualifying draw:
  Veronika Kapshay
  Ksenia Palkina
  Valeriya Urzhumova
  Valeriya Zeleva

The following player received entry as a lucky loser:
  Natalija Kostić

Champions

Men's singles

 Egor Gerasimov def.  Mikhail Kukushkin, 7–6(11–9), 4–6, 6–4

Women's singles

 Zhang Shuai def.  Ysaline Bonaventure, 6–3, 6–4

Men's doubles
 
 Toshihide Matsui /  Vishnu Vardhan def.  Evgeny Karlovskiy /  Evgeny Tyurnev, 7–6(7–3), 6–7(5–7), [10–7]

Women's doubles
 
 Natela Dzalamidze /  Veronika Kudermetova def.  Ysaline Bonaventure /  Naomi Broady, 6–2, 6–0

External links 
 2017 President's Cup at ITFtennis.com
 Official website

2017 ITF Women's Circuit
President's Cup
2017
2017 in Kazakhstani sport
Tennis tournaments in Kazakhstan